The following is a list of episodes for the television series Second City Television (SCTV).

Season 1 
Aired on Global
 "Season 1" is actually produced in two distinct 13-episode blocks, over a fifteen month period.  The cast consists of John Candy, Joe Flaherty, Eugene Levy, Andrea Martin, Catherine O'Hara, Harold Ramis, and Dave Thomas.  All are also listed as writers (except Martin and O'Hara on the first four episodes), with Ramis as head writer.

Season 2 

Aired on Global
 After a nine-month break, the show returns for Season 2.  The cast consists of John Candy, Joe Flaherty, Eugene Levy, Andrea Martin, Catherine O'Hara, and Dave Thomas.  Harold Ramis also returns, but only appears in the first and third episodes of the season.  He remains as head writer until close to the end of the season.

Season 3 

Aired on CBC
 After a year-and-a-half, SCTV returns for season three.  Returning cast members are Joe Flaherty, Eugene Levy, Andrea Martin, and Dave Thomas; they are joined by new cast members Robin Duke, Rick Moranis, and Tony Rosato. (John Candy and Catherine O'Hara were not in the cast this year, but would return.)  Although they appear in every episode, Levy and Andrea Martin film all their sketches and scenes on a "part-time" basis.

Season 4 

Aired on CBC (Canada), NBC (U.S.)

Only two months after season 3 ends, season 4 starts. Tony Rosato and Robin Duke both leave the show to be cast members on Saturday Night Live, which was infamously doing poorly with critics and in the ratings at that time, so much so that NBC actually started airing SCTV (named SCTV Network 90) as a possible replacement for SNL. John Candy and Catherine O'Hara rejoin the cast, and Eugene Levy and Andrea Martin return to doing the show full-time.  

The cast now consists of John Candy, Joe Flaherty, Eugene Levy, Andrea Martin, Rick Moranis, Catherine O'Hara, and Dave Thomas.  Many of the early season 4 episodes contain rerun sketches from seasons one to three. Former cast members Harold Ramis, Tony Rosato and Robin Duke can sometimes be seen in these sketches, but are uncredited. 

For the final three episodes of the season, Martin Short (who first appeared on the "Cisco Kid" episode in season three) is added to the cast.

Cycle 1

Cycle 2

The Best of SCTV Specials

Cycle 3

Season 5 
Aired on CBC (Canada), NBC (U.S.)

For season 5, the cast consists of John Candy, Joe Flaherty, Eugene Levy, Andrea Martin, and Martin Short.  Rick Moranis, Catherine O'Hara, and Dave Thomas all leave as cast members, though O'Hara and Thomas return for guest appearances, as does former cast member Harold Ramis.  

John Hemphill and Mary Charlotte Wilcox join the cast as featured players.

Cycle 4

Cycle 5

Season 6 
Aired on Superchannel (Canada), Cinemax (U.S.)

For season 6, the cast consists of Joe Flaherty, Eugene Levy, Andrea Martin, and Martin Short.  John Hemphill and Mary Charlotte Wilcox also return as featured players.

John Candy left the show after season 5, but returns for the season 6 opener.  Former cast members Catherine O'Hara and Dave Thomas also make guest appearances.

References 

SCTV
Second City Television